Nauders is a municipality in the district of Landeck in the Austrian state of Tyrol.

Geography
Nearby is the tripoint with the Swiss border; in the west, a road leads into the Sesvenna Alps and to Martina in the Lower Engadin valley.

Climate

History

In ancient times, the trade route across Reschen Pass was part of the Roman Via Claudia Augusta, leading from Italy across the Eastern Alps to the Raetian capital Augusta Vindelicorum (Augsburg). Nauders is probably located at the site of a mansio called Inutrium in contemporary sources. From 200 AD onwards, however, the significance of the road connection faded, when it was gradually superseded by the Brenner Pass road in the east.

The Nudres parish itself was first mentioned in an 1150 deed; from the 13th century it housed an important customs station. Over the centuries, numerous conflicts arose in the border area of the Tyrolean lands, held by the Austrian House of Habsburg from 1363, with the Swiss Confederacy, culminating in the Swabian War of 1499. Nauders, then part of the Tyrolean Vinschgau region in the south was administrated from Naudersberg Castle, a medieval fortress erected in the early 14th century. In 1472 the Habsburg archduke Sigismund of Austria had the Finstermünz fortress erected in the narrow gorge of the Inn river. 

Finstermünz finally lost its function when a new mountain road up to the Nauders high valley was laid out according to plans by Karl von Ghega in 1854. The Austrian authorities had the Hochfinstermünz Fortress erected on the new road into the Inntal valley instead, modelled on Franzensfeste Fortress and the federal fortress in Rastatt and manned by k.k. Landesschützen detachments.

At the end of World War II, numerous Nazi officials such as Eduard Roschmann and Oswald Menghin fled on a ratline through Nauders and Reschen Pass to escape arrest.

Notable people
Karl von Blaas (1815–1894), painter
Ernst Hairer (born 1949), mathematician

References

External links

Cities and towns in Landeck District